The Château de Saint Aubin is a historic château in Saint-Aubin-sur-Loire, Saône-et-Loire, Burgundy, France.

History
The chateau was built from 1771 to 1777 for Charles Jean-Baptiste des Gallois de La Tour.

It is owned by Kristen Van Riel, a retired corporate lawyer.

Architectural significance
The chateau was designed by architect Edme Verniquet in the Neoclassical architectural style. It has been listed as an official historical monument since February 4, 1943.

References

Châteaux in Saône-et-Loire
Houses completed in 1777
Neoclassical architecture in France
Monuments historiques of Bourgogne-Franche-Comté